The 2020–21 PSA Women's World Squash Championship was the 2020–21 women's edition of the World Squash Championships, which serves as the individual world championship for squash players. The event took place in Chicago, United States from 14 to 22 July 2021. It's the second time that Chicago hosted the PSA World Championships after 2018–19 edition.

World Ranking Points/Prize money
PSA also awards points towards World Ranking. Points are awarded as follows:

Prize money breakdown
Total prize money for the tournament is $1,000,000, $500,000 per gender. This is a 7,65% prize fund increase from previous World Championships (2019–20, $335,000 Men's/$430,000 Women's) that were held separately.

Seeds

  Nour El Sherbini (champion)
  Nouran Gohar (runner-up)
  Camille Serme (semifinals)
  Hania El Hammamy (quarterfinals)
  Amanda Sobhy (semifinals)
  Sarah-Jane Perry (quarterfinals)
  Joelle King (quarterfinals)
  Salma Hany (quarterfinals)

  Tesni Evans (third round)
  Joshna Chinappa (third round)
  Rowan Elaraby (third round)
  Olivia Clyne (third round)
  Nele Gilis (third round)
  Tinne Gilis (second round)
  Nadine Shahin (third round)
  Hollie Naughton (third round)

Draw and results

Finals

Top half

Section 1

Section 2

Bottom half

Section 3

Section 4

Schedule
Times are Central Daylight Time (UTC−05:00). To the best of five games.

Round 1

——————————————————————————————————————————————————————————————————————————————————————————————————————————

Round 2

Round 3

Quarter-finals

Semi-finals

Final

Representation
This table shows the number of players by country in the 2020–21 PSA Women's World Championship. A total of 21 nationalities are represented. Egypt is the most numerous nation with 14 players.

See also
 World Squash Championships
 2020–21 PSA Men's World Squash Championship

References

World Squash Championships
Men's World Squash Championship
Squash tournaments in the United States
International sports competitions hosted by the United States
PSA Men's World Squash Championship
PSA
PSA
Sports in Chicago
2020s in Chicago
Women's sports in Illinois